Miss Venezuela 1964 was the 11th edition of Miss Venezuela pageant held at Teatro Paris (now called Teatro La Campiña) in Caracas, Venezuela, on May 27, 1964. The winner of the pageant was Mercedes Revenga, Miss Miranda.

The pageant was broadcast live by RCTV and entertained by Los Melódicos.

Results
Miss Venezuela 1964 - Mercedes Revenga (Miss Miranda)
1st runner-up - Mercedes Hernández (Miss Portuguesa)
2nd runner-up - Lisla Silva (Miss Zulia)
3rd runner-up - Gloria Pesquera (Miss Bolívar)
4th runner-up - Hildegarth Rodríguez (Miss Nueva Esparta)

Delegates

 Miss Aragua - Eva Rodríguez
 Miss Barinas - Olga Mergarejo Rosales
 Miss Bolívar - Gloria Pesquera Rodríguez
 Miss Carabobo - Cecilia Castellanos
 Miss Departamento Libertador - Zulay Felice
 Miss Departamento Vargas - Marlene Salas Marrero
 Miss Distrito Federal - Magaly Villegas
 Miss Falcón - Lupe Foata
 Miss Guárico - Elina Leal Monteagudo
 Miss Lara - Marlene Veracoechea
 Miss Miranda - Mercedes Revenga De La Rosa
 Miss Monagas - Irma Añez Muñoz
 Miss Nueva Esparta - Hildegarth Rodríguez Velásquez
 Miss Portuguesa - Mercedes Hernández Nieves
 Miss Táchira - Alba Gómez Chacón
 Miss Trujillo - Judith Romero
 Miss Zulia - Lisla Silva Negrón

External links
Miss Venezuela official website

1964 beauty pageants
1964 in Venezuela